Dolicharthria aetnaealis is a species of moth in the family Crambidae. It is found in France, Portugal and  Spain, as well as North Africa, including Algeria and Morocco.

References

Moths described in 1833
Spilomelinae
Moths of Europe
Moths of Africa